Mustafa Cahit Kıraç (born 1956) is the governor of Diyarbakır Province in Turkey. Consecutively, he is former governor of İzmir, Adana, Sakarya, Aksaray and Şırnak provinces.

Personal Background
M. Cahit Kıraç was born and graduated from both primary school and high school in Elazığ. In 1979, he graduated from Ankara University, Faculty of Political Sciences.

References

Governor Cahit Kirac, Governor of Izmir Turkey, address at the opening ceremony of the World Congress of Consuls 2009

1956 births
Living people
Ankara University Faculty of Political Sciences alumni
Political office-holders in Turkey